Mangalkot Assembly constituency is an assembly constituency in Purba Bardhaman district in the Indian state of West Bengal.

Overview
As per orders of the Delimitation Commission, No. 272 Mangalkot assembly constituency covers Mongalkote community development block  and Saragram, Gidhgram and Alampur gram panchayats of Katwa I CD Block.

Mangalkot assembly constituency is part of No. 41 Bolpur (Lok Sabha constituency).

Members of Legislative Assembly

Election results

2021

2016

2011

 

.# Swing calculated on Congress+Trinamool Congress vote percentages in 2006 taken together.

1977-2006
Sadhana Mallik of CPI(M) won the Mangalkot assembly seat in 2006, 2001, and 1996 defeating Abdul Based Shekh of Trinamool Congress  in 2006, Chandranath Mukherjee of Trinamool Congress in 2001, and Absar Nurul Mondal of Congress in 1996. Contests in most years were multi cornered but only winners and runners are being mentioned. Samar Baora of CPI(M) defeated Hriday Kishan Sar of Congress in 1991. Nikhilananda Sar of CPI(M) defeated Jagadish Dutta of in 1987, Seikh Borshed of Congress in 1982, and Madan Chowdhury of Congress in 1977.

1951-1972
Jyotirmoy Majumder of Congress won in 1972. Nikhilananda Sar of CPI(M) won in 1971 and 1969. N.Sattar of Congress won in 1967. Narayan Das of CPI won in 1962. The Mangalkot seat was not there in 1957. In independent India's first election in 1951, Bhakta Chandra Roy of Congress won the Mangalkot seat.

References

Assembly constituencies of West Bengal
Politics of Purba Bardhaman district